Averinskaya is a rural locality (a village) in Ilinskoye Rural Settlement of Uglichsky District, in Yaroslavl Oblast, Russia. Population:

References 

Rural localities in Yaroslavl Oblast
Uglichsky District